The Prüfening dedicatory inscription is a high medieval inscription impressed on clay which was created in 1119, over three hundred years before Johannes Gutenberg, by the typographic principle. The inscription plate belongs to the Prüfening Abbey, a former Benedictine monastery, in Regensburg, Germany.

Description 
The Latin inscription is still at its original location in Prüfening Abbey, attached to one of the main pillars of its church. It reports the consecration act of the monastery in honour of St. George, carried out by the two bishops Otto of Bamberg and Hartwig of Regensburg. The inscription plate specifies the year of the act and, by implication, its own date as 1119 (•MCXVIIII•). It was made of baked clay, painted over in an alternating, red white pattern, and is approximately 26 cm wide, 41 cm high and 3 cm thick, with a crack running through its entire breadth. The sunk letterforms are the classical capitalis monumentalis or Roman square capitals. Copies are at display in several German museums, including the Gutenberg Museum at Mainz.

Typography 
The unusual sharpness of the inscription letters has long led epigraphists to believe that they were not carved by hand into the clay. The typographic character of the inscription was demonstrated in a systematic examination of the text body by the typesetter and linguist Herbert Brekle. His findings confirm that the text was produced with a printing method similar to that of the Phaistos Disc: The 17-line text was created by pressing individual, pre-formed stamps (probably made of wood) into the soft clay in a way that, for each letter which occurred more than once, the same letter stamp was re-used, thereby producing identical imprints throughout the text. Thus, the essential criterion for typographic text production was met, namely the repeated use of identical types for a single character. In applying this technique, it is not relevant that the Prüfening inscription was made by stamping letters into the clay and not − as later practiced by Gutenberg − by printing on paper, since neither the technical execution nor the print medium define movable type printing, but rather the criterion of type identity:

By projecting the text letters one upon the other (e.g., all "A"s onto one another) at high magnification, the consistent type identity of the dedicatory inscription could be demonstrated beyond doubt. An additional indication that its creator had worked with reusable types is the marked tendency of some letters to tilt to the right or left; in those cases the artisan apparently did not succeed in setting up the letter stamps completely parallel to the lateral borderline of the plate. The evidence of the skewed letters, but most importantly the observation that the type token criterion was met throughout the text prove the "typographic character of the Prüfening dedicatory inscription with certainty."

A fragment of another inscription plate found close to the monastery indicates that the Prüfening abbey inscription did not remain an isolated phenomenon, but that at least locally the typographic production method was applied more frequently.

Further medieval techniques 
In the cathedral of Cividale del Friuli in northern Italy, the silver altarpiece of Pellegrino II, the patriarch of Aquileia between 1195 and 1204, was inscribed in Latin by the means of individual letter punches (instead of stamps). Apart from stamping and punching, another typographic method existed which followed the scrabble principle: for decorating the paved floors of monasteries and churches, individual letter tiles were burnt and then so assembled that they formed Christian inscriptions on the floor. This technique seemed to be fairly widespread, with known examples ranging from England over the Netherlands to Germany.

Inscription text 
The Latin inscription runs written out in full:

Translated into English:

References

Sources 

Further medieval techniques

External links 

 Diocese of Regensburg: Former abbey church St. George at Prüfening

Medieval Christian inscriptions
Medieval Latin inscriptions
12th-century inscriptions
History of printing
Regensburg
1110s establishments in the Holy Roman Empire
1119 establishments in Europe
12th-century Christianity